Dan Burke may refer to:

Dan Burke (baseball) (1868–1933), MLB utility player
Dan Burke (basketball) (born 1959), NBA assistant coach
Daniel Burke (executive) (1929–2011), former president of Capital Cities Communications and American Broadcasting Corporation
Daniel J. Burke (born 1951), former Democratic member of the Illinois House of Representatives